The fire-eyed diucon (Pyrope pyrope) is a passerine bird of South America belonging to the tyrant flycatcher family Tyrannidae. It is the only species placed in the genus Pyrope.

It is 19–21 cm long. The upperparts are mainly plain grey. The underparts are pale grey with white throat and undertail-coverts. The eyes are bright coral-red, for which the bird is named.

It is found in central and southern Chile, southwestern Argentina, and Tierra del Fuego. Vagrant birds have occurred just eastwards of Tierra del Fuego in the Falkland Islands.

Taxonomy
This species was formerly placed in the genus Xolmis but was moved to the resurrected genus Pyrope following the publication of a genetic analysis in 2020.

Gallery

References

fire-eyed diucon
Birds of Chile
Birds of Tierra del Fuego
fire-eyed diucon
Taxa named by Heinrich von Kittlitz
Taxobox binomials not recognized by IUCN